Péruwelz ( or ;) is a city and municipality of Wallonia located in the province of Hainaut, Belgium. 

On 1 January 2018 Péruwelz had a total population of 17,113. The total area is 60.56 km2 which gives a population density of 280 inhabitants per km2.

This municipality is more specifically situated in Western Hainaut, also called Picardy Wallonia. Péruwelz is also near France, near the cities of "Condé-sur-l'Escaut", "Vieux Condé", "Hergnies", and is near the forest of Bon-Secours, the location of the castle of (l')Hermitage.

Composition of the municipality 

The current municipality of Péruwelz was formed in 1977 when the following ten municipalities were joined:
 I. Péruwelz
 II. Bon-Secours
 III. Roucourt
 IV. Bury (site of Bitremont Castle, or the Château de Bitremont)
 V. Braffe
 VI. Baugnies
 VII. Wasmes-Audemez-Briffœil
 VIII. Brasménil
 IX. Wiers
 X. Callenelle
The municipality also includes these villages:
 (XI.) Briffœil
 (XII.) Audemez
 (XIII.) Ringies
 (XIV.) Ponange

Fountains 
Péruwelz has a number of natural springs:
 The Dubuisson-Copin's washing-place fountain is in the communal gardens created in 1912. This fountain is the busiest.
De la Ferté Fountain
Du Flassart fountain, on the little place since 1898. 
Jaunay-Clan fountain. Jaunay-Clan is the name of the commune paired with Péruwelz. This fountain is made of stones from Jaunay-Clan.
Du Maréchal fountain. In the past named "Magrite fountain", "des Quatre-Cailloux fountain", and "des cailloux gris posés de chant fountain" until it was named "Du Maréchal fountain" in 1887 after its restoration.
Tanchou fountain.
De Verquesies fountain
Certain springs are not potable, tests are performed every day.

References

External links
 

Cities in Wallonia
Municipalities of Hainaut (province)